The Democratic Government Museum is a museum about the development and practice of parliamentary democracy, which is located at St. Paul's Hill in Malacca City, Malacca, Malaysia. The museum was formerly the Malacca State Legislative Assembly building, which had moved to Ayer Keroh as its present location since February 2000, in which its foundation stone was laid on 13 August 1961.

See also
 List of museums in Malaysia
 List of tourist attractions in Malacca

References

Buildings and structures in Malacca City
Government buildings completed in 1961
Museums in Malacca
20th-century architecture in Malaysia